The CCNI Arauco is a large container ship that experienced a major fire in the Port of Hamburg on September 1, 2016.
The vessel was only a year old, having been built in the Philippines, in 2015, at the Hanjin Subic Shipyard.

It took four days to extinguish the fire. Authorities took the risk of flooding her holds, and breaking her back, due to thermal shock, when local fireboats couldn't extinguish the fire.

Specifications

References

Container ships